Carditis (pl. carditides) is the inflammation of the heart.

It is usually studied and treated by specifying it as:
 Pericarditis is the inflammation of the pericardium
 Myocarditis is the inflammation of the heart muscle
 Endocarditis is the inflammation of the endocardium
 Pancarditis, also called perimyoendocarditis, is the inflammation of the entire heart: the pericardium, the myocardium and the endocardium
 Reflux carditis refers to a possible outcome of esophageal reflux (also known as GERD), and involves inflammation of the esophagus/stomach mucosa

References

Heart diseases